The Herman Brood Academie is a vocational school in Utrecht. It is a magnet school for the technical aspects of music production. The school was founded in 2006 and provides education at the secondary vocational education level in the Dutch education system.

Notable alumni and students
Martin Garrix, DJ, producer
Ana Maria Chipaila, DJ, Producer
Mr. Polska, rapper
Taymir, indie rock band
Kid de Blits, rapper
Mister and Mississippi, folk band
Joan Franka, singer-songwriter
Lisa Lois, pop singer
Nielson, pop singer
Rondé, band
Sevn Alias, rapper
Snelle, rapper
Sub Zero Project, DJ and producer duo
The Brahms, band
Yade Lauren, singer
Mesto, DJ, producer, songwriter
Aeden,  DJ, producer
Nona
Julian Jordan,  DJ, producer

References

Vocational universities in the Netherlands